The Leave This Town Tour was the first headlining concert tour, as well as first international tour, by American rock band, Daughtry. The tour was in support of the band's second album, Leave This Town (2009). The first North American leg kicked off in Topeka, Kansas on October 19, 2009. The tour concluded on October 29, 2010, in Johannesburg, South Africa. The 2010 North American leg of the tour grosses $11.4M and was the 60th best selling North American tour in 2010.

Background
The first North American leg began in October 2009. The band then toured Europe, serving as the opening act on Nickelback's Dark Horse Tour. The North American shows resumed with a more extensive second leg, which concluded in Summer 2010.

Opening acts
Cavo
Theory of a Deadman
Lifehouse
Kris Allen
Skillet (appeared to replace Lifehouse on one date)

Set lists

Tour dates

Personnel
Chris Daughtry – lead vocals, guitar
Josh Steely – lead guitar, backing vocals
Brian Craddock – rhythm guitar, backing vocals
Josh Paul – bass, backing vocals
Joey Barnes – drums, percussion, keyboard, backing vocals 
Robin Diaz – drums

References

External links

2009 concert tours
Daughtry (band) concert tours